Abul Kalam Azad is a Bangladeshi businessman, founder and managing director of Azad Products, who served as the president of the Bangladesh Printing Product Association.

Early life 
Azad was born Chandpur District and was raised in Shariatpur District. He worked in Dhaka as a lodging tutor.

Career 
Azad started his business by buying posters from Old Dhaka and selling them on the streets in 1982. He expanded the business, called Azad Products, by importing pinups of popular TV shows, such as The Bionic Woman, and footballers from Singapore and selling them in Bangladesh. In the 1990s he started using local celebrities more and with the profit he built Azad Centre in Paltan.

Azad expanded the company to create greeting cards and calendars. He became the president of the Bangladesh Printing Product Association. He also opened branches of Azad Products in different parts of Bangladesh. He established the  'Ratnagarva' award for exceptional mothers. In 2006, Banglalink created an television advertisement based on his biography.

The COVID-19 Pandemic in Bangladesh had been particularly difficult for Azad and his business. He had to close stores following declining demands.

Controversy 
Azad was arrested on 29 August 2009 after Inspector Golam Sarwar, of the Criminal Investigation Department, filled a case against him for allegedly assaulting him. The inspector had gone to Azad for a job for his brother. Azad was remanded for a day and his company issued a statement denying the allegations.

References 

Living people
Bangladeshi businesspeople
People from Chandpur District
Year of birth missing (living people)